Thirteen Chairs is a 1938 German comedy film directed by E. W. Emo and starring Heinz Rühmann, Hans Moser and Inge List. It is based on the 1928 novel The Twelve Chairs by Ilf and Petrov, one of numerous adaptations of the work.

The film's sets were designed by the art director Julius von Borsody. It was shot at the Terra Studios in Berlin and on location in Vienna.

Plot
A barber shop owner travels to Vienna to receive his inheritance from his late aunt. However, it appears all she has left him are thirteen old chairs. Needing to raise enough money to pay for his ticket back home, he sells them to a second-hand dealer. Only then does he discover a letter from his aunt telling him she has left  sewn into one of the chairs. He now sets out to track down the various new owners of the chairs to find the hidden money.

Cast
Heinz Rühmann as hairdresser Felix Rabe
Hans Moser as rag-and-bone man Alois Hofbauer
Annie Rosar as Karoline
Inge List as Lilly Walter
Hedwig Bleibtreu as Head Nurse in the House of Wise Men
 as friend
Karl Skraup as furniture store owner
Alfred Neugebauer as Eberhardt
Maria Waldner as Frau Eberhardt
Rudolf Carl as Doorman at the Lerchengasse

References

External links

1938 comedy films
German comedy films
Films of Nazi Germany
Films based on Russian novels
Films directed by E. W. Emo
Ilf and Petrov
Films scored by Nico Dostal
German black-and-white films
Terra Film films
Films shot in Vienna
Films set in Vienna
1930s German films